Van Buren County is a county located in the U.S. state of Michigan. As of the 2020 Census, the population was 75,587. The county seat is Paw Paw. The county was founded in 1829 and organized in 1837.

History
The county was named for Martin Van Buren before he became president. He was U.S. Secretary of State and later Vice President under President Andrew Jackson; thus Van Buren is one of Michigan's "Cabinet counties".

The Van Buren County Courthouse was built by Claire Allen, a prominent Southern Michigan architect; its cornerstone was laid on September 2, 1901, after a July vote to issue $35,000 in county bonds.

Government
Van Buren County has usually voted Republican in national elections. Since 1884, the county's voters have selected the Republican Party nominee in 79% (27 of 34) of the national elections through 2016. However, the county has become a swing county as well as a bellwether in recent years, voting for the overall winner in every presidential election from 1980 to 2016. It stayed with Donald Trump, a popular candidate in this county and other rural bellwethers, in the 2020 race.

Van Buren County operates the County jail, maintains rural roads, operates the major local courts, records deeds, mortgages, and vital records, administers public health regulations, and participates with the state in the provision of social services. The county board of commissioners controls the budget and has limited authority to make laws or ordinances. In Michigan, most local government functions – police and fire, building and zoning, tax assessment, street maintenance etc. – are the responsibility of individual cities and townships.

Elected officials
 Prosecuting Attorney: Susan Zuiderveen (R)
 Sheriff: Dan Abbott (R)
 County Clerk: Suzie Roehm (R)
 County Treasurer: Trisha Nesbitt (R)
 Register of Deeds: Paul W. DeYoung (R)
 Drain Commissioner: Joe Parman (R)
 County Surveyor: Charles Lossie (R)

Board of Commissioners
7 members, elected from districts (1 Democrat, 6 Republicans)

(information correct in March 2021)

Geography

Much of the county is farmland dotted with small towns. Areas near Kalamazoo County, specifically Antwerp Township and Almena Township, are becoming suburbanized. Many of the inland lakes are ringed with homes, either by people living year-round or cottagers, generally people who live the rest of the time in Chicago. Tourism is a major industry in the areas near Lake Michigan.

Rivers
 Paw Paw River
 Black River

Adjacent counties
By land

 Allegan County (north)
 Kalamazoo County (east)
 St. Joseph County (southeast)
 Cass County (south)
 Berrien County (southwest)

By water

 Lake County, Illinois (west)

Parks, preserves, natural areas

 Dunes Parkway, an 84-acre (340,000 m2) preserve of dunes in Covert Township
 Hamilton Township Coastal Plain Marsh Nature Sanctuary, a 79-acre (320,000 m2) preserve of coastal plain marsh in Hamilton Township owned by the Michigan Nature Association
 Jeptha Lake Fen Preserve, a 49-acre (200,000 m2) preserve in Columbia Township
 Kal-Haven Trail, a multi-use trail converted from old rail line that runs from Kalamazoo to South Haven
 Keeler State Game Area,  (1.6 km2) in Keeler Township
 Ross Preserve, a 1,449 acre (5.9 km2) preserve of coastal plain marsh in Covert Township owned by The Nature Conservancy
 Van Buren State Park
 Van Buren Trail State Park is adjacent to Kal-Haven Trail

Transportation

Highways

Public transportation
 Pere Marquette (Amtrak train)
 Van Buren Public Transit

Railroads
 Amtrak
 CSX Transportation
 Norfolk Southern, through Amtrak owned Michigan Line
 West Michigan Railroad

Demographics

The 2010 United States Census indicates Van Buren County had a 2010 population of 76,258. This decrease of -5 people from the 2000 United States Census indicated a nearly-zero population change in the decade. In 2010 there were 28,928 households and 20,434 families in the county. The population density was 125.5 per square mile (48.5 square kilometers). There were 36,785 housing units at an average density of 60.6 per square mile (23.4 square kilometers). The racial and ethnic makeup of the county was 82.7% White, 3.9% Black or African American, 0.7% Native American, 0.4% Asian, 10.2% Hispanic or Latino, 0.1% from other races, and 2.0% from two or more races.

There were 28,928 households, out of which 33.4% had children under the age of 18 living with them, 53.0% were husband and wife families, 12.1% had a female householder with no husband present, 29.4% were non-families, and 24.0% were made up of individuals. The average household size was 2.61 and the average family size was 3.07.

The county population contained 25.5% under age of 18, 7.8% from 18 to 24, 23.7% from 25 to 44, 29.3% from 45 to 64, and 13.8% who were 65 years of age or older. The median age was 40 years. For every 100 females, there were 98.3 males. For every 100 females age 18 and over, there were 96 males.

The 2010 American Community Survey 1-year estimate indicates the median income for a household in the county was $44,242 and the median income for a family was $53,642. Males had a median income of $28,079 versus $18,124 for females. The per capita income for the county was $21,495. About 10.0% of families and 14.8% of the population were below the poverty line, including 21.1% of those under the age 18 and 11.8% of those age 65 or over.

Communities

Cities
 Bangor
 Gobles
 Hartford
 South Haven (partial)

Villages

 Bloomingdale
 Breedsville
 Decatur
 Lawrence
 Lawton
 Mattawan
 Paw Paw (county seat)

Unincorporated communities

 Almena
 Berlamont (originally Bear Lake Mills)
 Columbia
 Corwin
 Covert
 Crystal Beach
 Fritzburg
 Glendale (named Lemont during 1868)
 Grand Junction
 Keeler
 Kibbie
 Kendall
 Lake-of-the-Woods
 Lacota (originally West Geneva, then Irvington)
 Maple Grove Corners
 McDonald
 Mentha (ghost town)
 North Lake
 Pine Grove Mills
 Roth Valley
 Sister Lakes
 Stoughton Corners
 Tea Pot Dome
 Toquin
 West Bangor

Townships

 Almena Township
 Antwerp Township
 Arlington Township
 Bangor Township
 Bloomingdale Township
 Columbia Township
 Covert Township
 Decatur Township
 Geneva Township
 Hamilton Township
 Hartford Township
 Keeler Township
 Lawrence Township
 Paw Paw Township
 Pine Grove Township
 Porter Township
 South Haven Township
 Waverly Township

Former townships 

 Clinch Township existed from 1837 until 1842, when it was divided into Waverly Township and Almena Township.

See also
 List of Michigan State Historic Sites in Van Buren County, Michigan
 National Register of Historic Places listings in Van Buren County, Michigan

References

External links
 Van Buren County - Official Site
 

 
Michigan counties
1837 establishments in Michigan
Populated places established in 1837